NW3 may refer to:

London NW3, a postcode area in England
EMD NW3
National Waterway 3, India